The 2016 Delaware Democratic presidential primary were held on April 26 in the U.S. state of Delaware as one of the Democratic Party's primaries ahead of the 2016 presidential election.

The Democratic Party's primaries in Connecticut, Maryland, Pennsylvania and Rhode Island were held the same day, as were Republican primaries in the same five states.

Opinion polling

Results

Results by county

Analysis
With a coalition of African Americans and college-educated, affluent Caucasian progressive/liberal professionals, Delaware was a state Hillary Clinton was expected to win in the so-called "Acela Primaries" on April 26. Clinton swept all three counties in the state and the largest cities of Wilmington and Dover, winning the primary by 19 points. This marked a clear difference from 2008, when she had lost Delaware to Barack Obama.

References

Delaware
Democratic primary
2016